Regian Eersel (born 16 December 1992) is a Surinamese-Dutch kickboxer currently signed to ONE Championship. He is the current ONE Lightweight Kickboxing and Muay Thai World Champion.

He is ranked as the best welterweight in the world by Combat Press as of September 2022, and the second best by Beyond Kick as of October 2022. He has been continually ranked in Combat Press the top 10 since March 2019.As of March 2023, Eersel is ranked the No. 3 light heavyweight by WBC Muaythai.

Background 
Eersel was born in Paramaribo, Suriname and moved to the Netherlands with his family when he was four years old. He started taekwondo at the age of eight, and transitioned to rugby afterwards. At the age of 15, he started training at Sityodtong Gym in Amsterdam. His nickname, The Immortal, was given to Eersel in this early amateur era. His teammates gave it to him, as he never used the break time between the rounds to sit and regain breath. 

As it was not easy to find competitors in the Netherlands after becoming a professional athlete in his weightclass, he tried his luck abroad. In Baku, Azerbaijan, Eersel took part in a K1-tournament, where he qualified for the finals. He did not win the finals, but the hunger for more had started.

After this Eersel was invited for competitions in his country of birth Surinam, Russia (W5), Greece, Germany, Turkey (Mix Fight Gala), the US (Legacy and Lion Fight) and China (Wu Lin Feng, Glory of Heroes).

Kickboxing career

Early career
Eersel made his Lion Fight debut against Jo Nattawut at Lion Fight 29 on May 27, 2016. He won the fight in the fifth round, with a head kick knockout. 

After defeating the two-weight Lion Fight champion, Eersel was given a chance to fight for the Super Middleweight title, with his opponent being Jake Purdy. The title bout took place at Lion Fight 33 on November 18, 2016. Eersel won the fight by a second round technical knockout. He then fought Chen Yawei during Mix Fight Gala 20, on December 3, 2016, winning the fight by a first round-knockout. Eersel made his first Lion Fight title defense against Dewitt Pratt at Lion Fight 34 on  February 3, 2017. He won the fight by a knockout in the first round.

Eersel took part in the Mix Fight Gala 78.5 kg tournament, which took place at Mix Fight Gala 21 on May 6, 2017. He beat Marco Pleschberger in the semi finals by a second-round technical knockout, and Sergej Braun in the finals by a first-round knockout to capture the tournament title.

Regian made his second Lion Fight title defense against Matous Kohout at Lion Fight 38 on September 29, 2017. He won the fight by a fifth round KO. His third title defense came during Lion Fight 50, when he defeated Joakim Hagg by a fifth round TKO.

ONE Championship
Eersel made his ONE Championship debut against Brad Riddell at ONE Championship: Heroes of Honor on April 2018. Eersel won the fight by a unanimous decision. Despite being contracted with ONE Championship, Eersel made his third Lion Fight title defense against Joakim Hagg at Lion Fight 50 on November 3, 2018. He won the fight by a fifth-round technical knockout.

Eersel faced Anthony Njokuani at ONE Championship: Call to Greatness on February 22, 2019. He won the fight by second-round knockout. The fight ended in some controversy, as Njokuani claimed an illegal elbow led to his stoppage loss. Njokuani later appealed the decision.

Lightweight kickboxing champion
On May 17, 2019, he challenged Nieky Holzken for the ONE Lightweight Kickboxing World Championship at ONE Championship 96: Enter the Dragon on May 17, 2019. He won the fight by unanimous decision. Eersel made his first title defense in an immediate rematch with Holzken at ONE Championship: Dawn Of Valor on October 26, 2019. He once again won the fight by unanimous decision.

Eersel was booked to make his second title defense against Mustapha Haida at ONE Championship: Unbreakable. However, Haida was forced to withdraw after sustaining an injury, leading to the cancellation of their bout. Regian Eersel was later scheduled to defend the ONE Lightweight Kickboxing World Championship against Islam Murtazaev at ONE Championship: Fists Of Fury 3 on March 19, 2021. Murtazaev himself would later withdraw, for undisclosed reasons, and was replaced by Mustapha Haida. Eersel successfully defended the title by unanimous decision.

Eersel defended his title against Islam Murtazaev at ONE: Winter Warriors on December 3, 2021. He won the bout via split decision.

Eersel is scheduled to make his fourth ONE lightweight title defense against Arian Sadikovic at ONE 156 on April 8, 2022. Despite suffering an early knockdown, Eersel rallied back to win the following rounds and retain his title by unanimous decision. He was awarded a $50,000 bonus for winning the fight.

Two sport lightweight champion
Eersel faced Sinsamut Klinmee for the inaugural ONE Muay Thai Lightweight title at ONE on Prime Video 3 on October 21, 2022. He captured the championship by split decision.

Eersel made his first lightweight Muay Thai title defense in an immediate rematch with Sinsamut Klinmee at ONE Friday Fights 9 on March 17, 2023. He won the fight by a fourth-round knockout. Eersel was awarded a $50,000 bonus following this victory.

Personal life
Eersel and his girlfriend have two daughters.

Championships  
 ONE Championship
 ONE Lightweight Muay Thai World Championship (One time; current) 
One successful title defense
 ONE Lightweight Kickboxing World Championship (One time; current)  
Four successful title defenses
 Performance of the Night (Two time) 
Mix Fighting Championship
 2017 Mix Fight -78.5 kg Tournament Winner
Lion Fight
 Lion Fight Super Middleweight World Champion (168 lb) 2016

Fight record 

|- style="background:#cfc;"
| 2023-03-17|| Win ||align=left| Sinsamut Klinmee || ONE Friday Fights 9 || Bangkok, Thailand || KO (Left hook to the body) || 4 ||1:17 
|-
! style=background:white colspan=9 |

|- style="background:#CCFFCC;"
| 2022-10-22|| Win ||align=left| Sinsamut Klinmee || ONE on Prime Video 3 || Kuala Lumpur, Malaysia || Decision (Split) || 5 || 3:00
|-
! style=background:white colspan=9 |

|- style="background:#CCFFCC;"
| 2022-04-22|| Win ||align=left| Arian Sadiković || ONE 156 || Kallang, Singapore || Decision (Unanimous) || 5 || 3:00
|-
! style=background:white colspan=9 |
|- style="background:#CCFFCC;"
| 2021-12-03|| Win ||align=left| Islam Murtazaev || ONE: Winter Warriors || Kallang, Singapore || Decision (Split) || 5 || 3:00
|-
! style=background:white colspan=9 |
|-  style="background:#CCFFCC;"
| 2021-02-26|| Win ||align=left| Mustapha Haida || ONE Championship: Fists Of Fury 3 || Kallang, Singapore || Decision (Unanimous) || 5 || 3:00 
|-
! style=background:white colspan=9 |
|-  style="background:#CCFFCC;"
| 2019-10-26|| Win ||align=left| Nieky Holzken ||  |ONE Championship: Dawn Of Valor || Jakarta, Indonesia || Decision (Unanimous) || 5 || 3:00 
|-
! style=background:white colspan=9 |
|-  style="background:#CCFFCC;"
| 2019-05-17|| Win ||align=left| Nieky Holzken ||  |ONE Championship 96: Enter the Dragon || Kallang, Singapore || Decision (unanimous) || 5 || 3:00
|-
! style=background:white colspan=9 |
|-
|-  style="background:#CCFFCC;"
| 2019-02-22|| Win ||align=left| Anthony Njokuani || |ONE Championship: Call to Greatness  || Singapore || KO (Right hook) || 2 || 1:03
|-
|-  style="background:#CCFFCC;"
| 2018-11-03|| Win ||align=left| Joakim Hagg || Lion Fight 50 || Los Angeles, United States || TKO || 5 || 3:00
|-
! style=background:white colspan=9 |
|-
|-  style="background:#CCFFCC;"
| 2018-04-20|| Win ||align=left| Brad Riddell || ONE Championship: Heroes of Honor || Manila, Philippines || Decision (Unanimous)|| 3 || 3:00
|-
|-  style="background:#CCFFCC;"
| 2018-03-03|| Win ||align=left| Jamal Yusupov || Wu Lin Feng 2018: World Championship Tianjin || Tianjin, China || Decision || 3 || 3:00
|-  style="background:#CCFFCC;"
| 2017-12-02|| Win ||align=left| Darryl Sichtman || Mix Fight Gala 23 || Frankfurt, Germany || Decision || 3 || 3:00
|-  style="background:#CCFFCC;"
| 2017-09-29|| Win ||align=left| Matous Kohout || Lion Fight 38 || United States || KO (Knee to the body) || 5 || 1:00 
|-
! style=background:white colspan=9 |
|-
|-  style="background:#CCFFCC;"
| 2017-07-01|| Win ||align=left| Djibril Ehouo || Wu Lin Feng || China || KO ||  ||
|-  style="background:#CCFFCC;"
| 2017-05-06|| Win ||align=left| Sergej Braun || Mix Fight Gala 21, Final || Heilbronn, Germany || KO (Left hook to the body) || 1 ||
|-
! style=background:white colspan=9 |
|-
|-  style="background:#CCFFCC;"
| 2017-05-06|| Win ||align=left| Marco Pleschberger || Mix Fight Gala 21, Semi Final || Heilbronn, Germany || TKO || 2 ||
|-  style="background:#CCFFCC;"
| 2017-04-01|| Win ||align=left| Ma Yueheng || Wu Lin Feng 2017: China VS Europe || China || KO (Knee to the Body) || 1 || 1:24
|-  style="background:#CCFFCC;"
| 2017-02-03|| Win ||align=left| Dewitt Pratt || Lion Fight 34 || Las Vegas, United States || KO (Flying Knee + right cross)|| 1 ||
|-
! style=background:white colspan=9 |
|-
|-  style="background:#CCFFCC;"
| 2016-12-03|| Win ||align=left| Chen Yawei || Mix Fight Gala 20 || Frankfurt, Germany || KO (Knee to the body)|| 1 || 
|-
|-  style="background:#CCFFCC;"
| 2016-11-18|| Win ||align=left| Jake Purdy || Lion Fight 33 || United States || KO (Flying Knee) || 2 || 
|-
! style=background:white colspan=9 |
|-
|-  style="background:#CCFFCC;"
| 2016-05-27|| Win ||align=left| Jo Nattawut || Lion Fight 29 || United States || KO (Right high kick) || 5 || 
|-
|-  style="background:#FFBBBB;"
| 2016-03-18|| Loss ||align=left| Matous Kohout || Heroes Gate 16 || Czech Republic || Decision || 3 || 3:00 
|-
|-  style="background:#CCFFCC;"
| 2015-12-05|| Win ||align=left| Wang Anying || Wu Lin Feng || China || KO ||  || 
|-
|-  style="background:#CCFFCC;"
| 2015-04-19|| Win ||align=left| Khalid Bourdif || The Best of all Elements || Almere, Netherlands || TKO (Doctor stoppage)|| 2 ||
|-  style="background:#CCFFCC;"
| 2015-04-04|| Win ||align=left| Nu Erla || Wu Lin Feng || China || KO (High Kick)|| 2 || 
|-
|-  style="background:#FFBBBB;"
| 2015-01-16|| Loss ||align=left| Cosmo Alexandre || Legacy Kickboxing 1 || Houston, United States || Decision || 3 || 3:00
|-
|-  style="background:#CCFFCC;"
| 2014-12-23|| Win ||align=left| Lorand Sachs || Fighting With The Stars || Paramaribo, Suriname || Decision || 3 || 3:00
|-
|-  style="background:#FFBBBB;"
| 2014-10-11|| Loss ||align=left| Alexander Surzhko || W5 "GRAND PRIX REMATCH || Moscow, Russia || Decision || 3 || 3:00
|-
|-  style="background:#CCFFCC;"
| 2013-12-22|| Win ||align=left| Alexey Alexeev || W5 "GRAND PRIX MOSCOW || Moscow, Russia || KO || 3 || 
|-
|-  style="background:#CCFFCC;"
| 2013-11-16|| Win ||align=left| Ivan Babachenko || W5 "GRAND PRIX OREL || Moscow, Russia || Decision || 3 || 3:00
|-
|-
| colspan=9 | Legend:

See also
 List of male kickboxers

References

External links 
Official ONE Championship profile

1992 births
Living people
Dutch male kickboxers
Surinamese male kickboxers
Lightweight kickboxers
Welterweight kickboxers
Middleweight kickboxers
Dutch Muay Thai practitioners
Surinamese Muay Thai practitioners
Sportspeople from Paramaribo
Sportspeople from Amsterdam
Surinamese emigrants to the Netherlands
ONE Championship kickboxers
Kickboxing champions
ONE Championship champions